Lamar or Lamarr is a word with multiple origins that may refer to:

People
Lamar (given name), a list of people
Lamar (surname), a list of people

Fictional characters
Hedley Lamarr, in Mel Brooks's movie Blazing Saddles, played by Harvey Korman
Lamar Latrell, in the Revenge of the Nerds movie series
Lamar Alford, in the off-Broadway musical Godspell
Lamar Davis, in the Grand Theft Auto V 2013 video game
Lamarr, a headcrab from the game Half-Life 2
Lamar Williams, professional otaku and member of MD-5 from the Meta Runner internet series

Places in the United States
Lamar, Arkansas, a city
Lamar, Colorado, a home rule municipality and county seat
Lamar, Indiana, an unincorporated community
Lamar, Mississippi, an unincorporated community
Lamar, Missouri, a city and county seat
Lamar, Nebraska, a village
Lamar, Oklahoma, a town
Lamar, Pennsylvania, a census-designated place
Lamar, South Carolina, a town
Lamar, Tennessee, an unincorporated community
Lamar, Texas, an unincorporated community and census-designated place
Lamar, West Virginia, an unincorporated community
Lamar, Wisconsin, an unincorporated community
Lamar County, Alabama
Lamar County, Georgia
Lamar Mounds and Village Site, an archaeological site in Georgia
Lamar County, Mississippi
Lamar County, Texas
Lamar River, Wyoming
Lamar Township, Barton County, Missouri
Lamar Township, Clinton County, Pennsylvania

Schools in the United States
Lamar University, Beaumont, Texas
Lamar Institute of Technology, a public technical school in Beaumont, Texas
Lamar State College–Port Arthur, a community college in Port Arthur, Texas
Lamar State College–Orange, a community college in Orange, Texas
Lamar High School (disambiguation)
Lamar School (Meridian, Mississippi)
Lamar Middle School (Irving, Texas)

Transportation
Lamar Municipal Airport (Colorado), Lamar, Colorado, United States
Lamar (Amtrak station), Lamar, Colorado
Lamar (RTD), a light rail station in Lakewood, Colorado
Lamar Municipal Airport (Missouri), Lamar, Missouri

Other uses
, a World War II transport
, a patrol craft commissioned in 1945 and transferred to the US Coast Guard in 1964
Lamar Towers, a building in Jeddah, Saudi Arabia
Lamar Building, Augusta, Georgia, United States, on the National Register of Historic Places
Lamar Advertising Company

See also
De Lamar, Idaho, United States, a ghost town